Abraha (Ge’ez: አብርሃ) (also spelled Abreha, died after 570 CE), also known as Abrahah al-Ashram, was an  Aksumite army general, then the viceroy of South Arabia for the Kingdom of Aksum, and later declared himself an independent King of Himyar. Abraha ruled much of present-day Arabia and Yemen from around 531–547 CE to around 555–570 CE.

Life
Dhu Nuwas, the Jewish Himyarite ruler of Yemen, c. 523–525 or c. 518–20 launched military operations against the Aksumite Christians and their local Arab Christian allies. Many Aksumites in Zafar were killed, their fortresses in the Yemeni highlands destroyed, and Najran sacked.

Najran fell in 518 or 523 and many members of the Himyarite Christian community were put to death. This incident, which is also mentioned in the Quran in Sura #85-Al-Burooj, evoked great sympathy throughout the neighbouring Christian regions and prompted an Aksumite military intervention supported by the Aksumite fleet and aided by a small Byzantine fleet.

The Byzantine historian Procopius identified Abraha as the former slave of a Roman merchant who conducted business in Adulis. Later, Abraha was either one of the commanders or a member of one of the armies led by King Kaleb of Axum against Dhu Nuwas. In al-Tabari's history, Abraha is said to have been the commander of the second army sent by Kaléb after the first, led by 'Ariat, failed.

Abraha was reported to have led his army of 100,000 men to successfully crush all resistance by the Yemeni army and then, following the suicide of Dhu Nuwas, seized power and established himself at Sanaa. He aroused the wrath of Kaleb, however, by withholding tribute.  In response, king Kaleb sent his general 'Ariat to take over the governorship of Yemen.  On version of what then happened was that Abraha fought a duel with 'Ariat which resulted in 'Ariat being killed and Abraha suffering the injury which earned him the sobriquet of al-Asräm, "scar-face." It was also said that Abraha's nose had either been lost in battle or had been severely damaged due to a disease.

According to Procopius, Abraha seized control of Yemen from Esimiphaios (Sumuafa' Ashawa'), the Christian Himyarite viceroy appointed by Kaléb, with the support of dissident elements within the Aksum occupation force who were eager to settle in the Yemen, then a rich and fertile land. Stuart Munro-Hay, who proposes a 518 date for the rise of Dhu Nuwas, dates this event to 525, while by the chronology based on Dhu Nuwas coming to power in 523, this event would have happened about 530, although a date as late as 543 has been postulated by Jacques Ryckmans.

An army sent by Kaléb to subdue Abraha decided instead to join his ranks and killed the commander (this is perhaps a reference to 'Ariat) and a second army was defeated. After this Kaléb had to accord Abraha de facto recognition before Abraha earned more formal recognition under Kaleb's successor in return for a nominal tribute.

Rule

Abraha is seen as then becoming a prominent figure in Yemen's history, promoting the cause of Christianity in the face of the prevalent Judaism and paganism of Central Arabia. Abraha was a zealous Christian.  He is said to have built a great church at San'a' (in competition of the Kaaba located in Mecca which was the most prominent religious site in all of Arabia) and to have repaired the principal irrigation dam at the Sabaean capital of Marib.

Epigraphic sources chronicling 'Abraha's career include an inscription on the Marib Dam recording the quelling of an insurrection backed by a son of the deposed ruler, Esimiphaios, in the year 657 of the Sabaean era (i.e. between 540–550 CE); vital repairs made to the dam later in the same year; the reception of envoys from the Negus, from Byzantium, from Persia and from Al-Harith ibn Jabalah, the phylarch of Arabia; and the completion of repairs to the dam in the following year, followed by a great feast of rejoicing.

The royal title adopted by Abraha "King of Saba' and dhü-Raydän and Hadhramaut and Yamanat and of their Arabs on the plateau and the lowland" was that used previously by the Himyarites.

Church construction
According to the National Museum of Saudi Arabia in Riyadh, Abraha built the Al-Qullays (from the Greek Ekklesia) cathedral in Sana'a.  Abraha is said to have built the cathedral to rival the Kaaba at Mecca. He also built a church in Najran for Bani Al-Harith, the House of Allat in Taif for the tribe of Thaqeef, the House of Yareem and the House of Ghamdan in Yemen.

Death

Munro-Hay dates his death to some time after 553 based on the inscription at Murayghän. Islamic tradition places his death immediately after his expedition to Mecca. He was succeeded on the throne by two of his sons, Yaksum and Masruq, whose mother was Raihäna, a Yemenite noblewoman whom Abraha had abducted from her husband.

Between 570 and 575 a pro-Persian group in Yemen made contact with the Sassanid king through the Lakhmid princes in Al-Hirah. The Sassanids then sent troops under the command of Wahriz, who helped (the semi-legendary) Sayf ibn Dhi Yazan drive the Aksumites from Yemen and Southern Arabia.  As a result Southern Arabia and Yemen came within the sphere of influence of the Sassanian empire.

Islamic tradition

Islamic tradition credits Abraha with a military expedition against the Quraysh of Mecca in an invasion of the Hejaz in 570, known as the Year of the Elephant. According to these Islamic traditions, Abraha was building a cathedral in the city of Sanaa to act as a centre for pilgrimage. Realising that the Kaaba was already in use for such a purpose, Abraha set out to destroy the Kaaba so that all the pilgrims would go to his new cathedral to the financial benefit of his kingdom. Abraha had a troop of about 13 war elephants in the expeditionary forces. Muhammad's paternal grandfather, Abd al-Muttalib, put the battle in God's hands, realising that he could not take on the forces of Abraha. As Abraha's forces approached the city, the story goes:

The next day, as they prepared for battle, they discovered that their elephant (called Mahmud) refused to approach Mecca. Even worse, birds came from the sea, each of which brought three small stones, which they dropped on the soldiers of Abraha. Everyone hit by these stones was killed. Abraha was hit repeatedly and slowly dismembered. By the time he reached Sanaa, he was nothing but a miserable stump of a body. His heart burst from his chest, and he died. So the year of the War of the Elephant was a year of death. But it was also a year of life, for in that same year Muhammad was born.

Critique of Islamic Traditional Version 
Outside of later Islamic tradition, there is no mention of Abraha's expedition at Mecca, including from Abraha's own inscriptions. Historians see the story as a later Islamic tradition designed to explain the "Men of the Elephant" in Qur'an 105:1-5. However, recent findings of Himyaritic inscriptions describe an hitherto unknown expedition by Abraha, which subsequently led Iwona Gajda to identify this expedition as the failed conquest of Mecca. In addition, Christian scholar Julien Robin notes that the historicity of a failed expedition is completely plausible, given that the Quraysh, despite their small number and poverty, quickly rose to prominence in the following years, evidenced by the great fair of Quraysh, held in al-ʿUkāẓ, as well as the ḥums cultural association, which associated members of tribes of Western Arabia with the Mecca sanctuary. 

Gajda accepted the dating of the expedition to 552 CE, thus not coinciding with the birth of the Prophet, traditionally dated to 570 CE.  It also observed that Mecca is not mentioned in the inscription. On the other hand, Daniel Beck claims that there are several issues with the story. He claimed that African war elephants hadn't been used in the region for over 600 years. It is also difficult to explain how Abraha would have obtained African war elephants in Arabia. Furthermore, Qur'an 105 appears to be appealing to traditions from 2 Maccabees and 3 Maccabees, and not referencing any expedition on Abraha's part. However, Michael Charles published a study where he detailed how the Aksumite kingdom used elephants for war and had access to them during the 6th century when the expedition is said to have taken place. It should also be noted that while 2 Maccabees mentioned elephants as war beasts and a foiled military expedition, it did not mention any flying creatures. However angels as protective flying creatures foiling an elephant army can be found in 3 Maccabees 5 and 6:18-21.

See also
Kingdom of Aksum
Shaiba ibn Hashim

References

People from the Aksumite Empire
6th-century soldiers
6th-century viceregal rulers
Pre-Islamic Arabia
Yemeni Christians
South Arabia
Ethiopian military personnel